is a railway station in Takeo, Saga Prefecture, Japan. It is operated by JR Kyushu and is on the Sasebo Line.

Lines
Only Sasebo Line local services stop at this station.

Station layout 
The station, which is unstaffed, consists of two side platforms serving two tracks with a siding branching off one of the tracks. The station building is a timber structure in Dutch style which is presently unstaffed and serves only as a waiting room. Access to the opposite side platform is by means of a footbridge.

Adjacent stations

History
Japanese Government Railways (JGR) opened the station on 21 August 1923 as an additional station on the existing track of what was then the Nagasaki Main Line. On 1 December 1934, another route was designated the Nagasaki Main Line. The track serving the station was redesignated the Sasebo Line. With the privatization of Japanese National Railways (JNR), the successor of JGR, on 1 April 1987, control of the station passed to JR Kyushu.

Passenger statistics
In fiscal 2015, there were a total of 49,689 boarding passengers, giving a daily average of 136 passengers.

Environs
National Route 34
National Route 498
Nagasaki Expressway Takeo-Kitagata InterChange
Takahashi Post Office

See also
 List of railway stations in Japan

References

External links
Takahashi Station (JR Kyushu)

Railway stations in Japan opened in 1923
Sasebo Line
Railway stations in Saga Prefecture